Sir Samuel Hannay, 3rd Baronet (c. 1742 – 11 December 1790) was an English politician who served as Member of Parliament for Camelford between 5 July 1784 and 11 December 1790. He is buried in St Marylebone Parish Church, London.

References

1740s births
1790 deaths
Baronets in the Baronetage of Nova Scotia
People from the City of London
British MPs 1784–1790
British MPs 1790–1796
Members of the Parliament of Great Britain for constituencies in Cornwall